The Campeonato Internacional de Verano 2010, also known after its sponsored name Copa Bimbo 2010, was the second edition of the Campeonato Internacional de Verano, an exhibition international club football competition that featured three clubs from Uruguay and one from Paraguay. It was played in Montevideo, Uruguay at the Estadio Centenario from 15 to 18 January 2010. It was won by Uruguayan club Nacional, who defeated fellow Uruguayan side Danubio in the final.

Bracket

Matches

Semi-finals

Third place

Final

Scorers
2 goals
  Diego Ifrán (Danubio)
  Diego Perrone (Danubio)
  Ricardo Mazacote  (Nacional)

1 goal
  Carlos Grossmüller (Danubio)
  Marcelo Andrés Silva (Danubio)
  Herminio Miranda (Nacional)
  Blas Irala (Nacional)
  Rubén Olivera (Peñarol)
  Diego Alonso (Peñarol)
  Sergio Blanco (Nacional)

2010
2010 in Paraguayan football
2009–10 in Uruguayan football